Kirsti Lay (born 7 April 1988) is a Canadian former professional racing cyclist, who rode professionally for UCI Women's Team  between 2016 and 2019. She rode at the 2015 UCI Track Cycling World Championships, winning a bronze medal in the Team Pursuit. In 2016, she was named in Canada's 2016 Olympic team. She won the bronze medal in the team pursuit event.

Prior to taking up cycling Lay was a speed skater, competing at the World Junior Speed Skating Championships in 2005, 2006 and 2007 and at the 2009 Winter Universiade.

Personal life
Lay is married to Canadian former speed skater Mathieu Giroux.

Major results

Track

2014
 Team pursuit, 2014–15 UCI Track Cycling World Cup
2nd  Guadalajara
3rd  London
2015
 1st  Team pursuit, Pan American Games (with Allison Beveridge, Laura Brown and Jasmin Glaesser)
 Team pursuit, 2015–16 UCI Track Cycling World Cup
1st  Cali
2nd  Cambridge
 2nd  Team pursuit, Pan American Track Championships (with Allison Beveridge, Annie Foreman-Mackey and Stephanie Roorda)
 3rd  Team pursuit, UCI Track World Championships
2016
 2nd  Team pursuit, UCI Track World Championships
 3rd  Team pursuit, Olympic Games
2017
 3rd  Team pursuit, 2016–17 UCI Track Cycling World Cup, Los Angeles

Road

2014
 5th Grand Prix cycliste de Gatineau
2015
 1st  Mountains classification Tour of California
 10th Overall San Dimas Stage Race
2017
 1st Stage 1 Cascade Cycling Classic
 2nd Road race, National Road Championships
 2nd Grand Prix Cycliste de Gatineau
 8th Chrono Gatineau
 9th Winston-Salem Cycling Classic
2018
 3rd Time trial, National Road Championships
 3rd White Spot / Delta Road Race
 4th Winston-Salem Cycling Classic
 10th Overall Tour of the Gila

References

External links
 

1988 births
Living people
Canadian female cyclists
Sportspeople from Medicine Hat
Canadian female speed skaters
Cyclists at the 2015 Pan American Games
Pan American Games gold medalists for Canada
Olympic cyclists of Canada
Olympic bronze medalists for Canada
Cyclists at the 2016 Summer Olympics
Medalists at the 2016 Summer Olympics
Olympic medalists in cycling
Pan American Games medalists in cycling
Medalists at the 2015 Pan American Games